Louis Franklin DiMauro (born April 9, 1953, Brooklyn, NY) is an American atomic physicist, the Edward and Sylvia Hagenlocker Professor In the Department of Physics at The Ohio State University, Columbus, Ohio, USA. His interests are atomic, molecular and optical physics. He has been elected a Fellow of the American Association for the Advancement of Science, American Physical Society and Optical Society.

Career
DiMauro received his BS from Hunter College, CUNY and his Ph.D. from University of Connecticut in 1980 and was a postdoctoral fellow at Stony Brook University before arriving at AT&T Bell Laboratories as a Member of the Technical Staff in 1981. He joined the staff at Brookhaven National Laboratory in 1988 rising to the rank of senior scientist. Concurrently, he was appointed visiting Professor of Physics at Stony Brook University. In 2004 he accepted the position of Professor and the Edward and Sylvia Hagenlocker Chair of Physics at The Ohio State University.

His research interest is in experimental ultra-fast and strong-field physics. In 1993, he and his collaborators introduced the widely accepted semi-classical rescattering or three-step model in strong-field physics.

Honors and awards
His research accomplishments have been recognized by:
 2004 DOE BNL/BSA Science & Technology Prize 
 2012 OSU Distinguished Scholar Award
 2013 OSA William F. Meggers Award in Spectroscopy
 2017 APS Arthur Schawlow Prize.

Selected publications

References

1953 births
Living people
City University of New York alumni
University of Connecticut alumni
Fellows of the American Association for the Advancement of Science
Fellows of the American Physical Society
Ohio State University faculty
21st-century American physicists